Nerva may refer to:

 Nerva, a Roman cognomen
 Nerva (30–98), Roman emperor (reigning 96–98)
 Nerva Traianus, or Trajan (53–117), Roman emperor (reigning 98–117)
 Cocceii Nervae, a family of the gens Cocceia
 Marcus Cocceius Nerva (disambiguation), politicians and relatives of emperor Nerva
 Licinii Nervae, a family of the gens Licinia.
 Quintus Acutius Nerva, Roman consul in AD 100, from the gens Acutia
 Nerva, Huelva, municipality in Huelva province, Spain
 NERVA – acronym for "Nuclear Engine for Rocket Vehicle Application", part of a NASA project to produce a nuclear thermal rocket engine
 Nerva, the leader of a hemophage resistance group from which Violet Song-jat Shariff separates, in the movie Ultraviolet
 Space Station Nerva, a fictional space station from the Doctor Who episodes "The Ark in Space" and "Revenge of the Cybermen"

See also 
 Nervi  (disambiguation)
 Nervo (disambiguation)